Espen Uhlen Jørstad (born May 1988) is a Norwegian professional poker player currently residing in London, England. In 2022, he won the World Series of Poker Main Event for $10,000,000.

Career
Jørstad obtained a Masters degree in brewing science from the University of Copenhagen and worked at a brewery before his poker career.

He started streaming on Twitch in 2016 under alias uhlenpoker as a sponsored Unibet poker pro, before rebranding to group channel overbetexpress.

Playing under the names "Hymn2ninkasi" on PokerStars and "COVFEFE-19" on GGPoker, Jørstad primarily focused on cash games. He reached his first World Series of Poker final table in 2020, finishing in fifth place in a $400 Fifty Stack event during the WSOP Online. In 2021, he was sixth in the WSOP Online Main Event, earning $603,058.

Jørstad won his first WSOP bracelet in 2022, partnering with Patrick Leonard in the Tag Team event. In the Main Event, he made the final table in a field of 8,663, the second-largest in WSOP history, and went heads-up against Adrian Attenborough. Jørstad had  for a full house to win the championship. He became the first Main Event champion from Norway.

As of 2022, Jørstad's total live earnings exceed $10,271,000, placing him in first on Norway's all-time money list.

World Series of Poker bracelets

References

External links
Hendon Mob profile
WSOP.com profile

Norwegian poker players
World Series of Poker bracelet winners
World Series of Poker Main Event winners
1988 births
Living people